Blues at Sunrise is an album by Stevie Ray Vaughan and Double Trouble, released on April 4, 2000. Released a decade after his death, the album features ten previously unreleased songs from Vaughan.

Critical reception

Stephen Thomas Erlewine of AllMusic concludes his review with, "Blues at Sunrise is strong and entertaining, working quite well as a mood piece. It may not be revelatory, but if you strip away your qualms and quibbles, it's enjoyable."

Jim Caligiuri of The Austin Chronicle gives this album 3 stars and writes, "While the concept of Blues at Sunrise is appealing and the music is top-notch, any novice SRV fans would be better served approaching his music from one of his original releases."

Track listing

Track information and credits adapted from the album's liner notes.

References

2000 albums
Stevie Ray Vaughan albums